Lautaro Alberto Morales (born 16 December 1999) is an Argentinian professional footballer who plays as a goalkeeper for Newell's Old Boys, on loan from Lanús.

Club career
Morales progressed through the Lanús youth ranks, signing in 2011. He became a first-team member at the start of the 2019–20 campaign, though wouldn't make a competitive appearance in that season; going unused on the bench twenty-eight times in total. His senior debut did arrive at the beginning of the next season, though, with the goalkeeper playing the full duration of a victory over Brazilian side São Paulo in the Copa Sudamericana second stage, first leg on 28 October 2020.

On 5 August 2022, Morales joined Newell's Old Boys on a loan deal until June 2023.

International career
In 2017, with no prior youth call-ups, Morales was selected to train with the Argentine senior squad ahead of friendlies with Brazil and Singapore in Asia and Oceania. Two years later, Morales was called up by Argentina for the 2019 South American U-20 Championship in Chile. He didn't make an appearance but was on the bench for all nine matches as they qualified for the 2019 FIFA U-20 World Cup, though he didn't make the squad for that tournament in Poland.

Personal life
In September 2020, it was confirmed that Morales had tested positive for COVID-19 amid the pandemic; he isolated after showing symptoms.

Career statistics
.

Notes

References

External links

1999 births
Living people
Argentine footballers
People from Quilmes
Association football goalkeepers
Olympic footballers of Argentina
Footballers at the 2020 Summer Olympics
Sportspeople from Buenos Aires Province
Argentine Primera División players
Club Atlético Lanús footballers
Newell's Old Boys footballers